Princess Anne of Denmark may refer to:
Princess Anne of Denmark (1917–1980), mother of photographer Lord Lichfield and cousin of Elizabeth II
Anne of Denmark, Electress of Saxony (1532–1585), wife of Augustus of Saxony
Anne of Denmark (1574–1619), wife of James VI and I
Anne, Queen of Great Britain (1665–1714), known as Princess Anne of Denmark between her marriage and accession